Rosemarie Haag Bletter is a German-born American architectural historian, university professor, writer, and lecturer.

Education

Bletter was educated at Columbia University, where she received her BS, MA, and PhD. She completed a master’s thesis on the Catalan Modernista architect Josep Vilaseca and a doctoral dissertation on the work of Bruno Taut and Paul Scheerbart.

Academic career

Bletter has taught at Yale, Columbia, the Institute of Fine Arts, New York University, and CUNY Graduate Center. She supervised twenty-five doctoral dissertations, among them those of the scholars Barry Bergdoll, Larry Busbea, and Gabrielle Esperdy. An expert on twentieth-century European and American architecture, she was instrumental in the favorable reappraisal of Art Deco building design during the 1970s, is particularly known for her seminal writings on German Expressionist and Early Modernist architecture, as well as for her cultural analysis of the architecture of Robert Venturi and Denise Scott Brown, and as an early exponent in academia of Frank Gehry's work.

Curatorial

Bletter was an organizer of the 1975 Brooklyn Museum exhibition "Skyscraper Style" (co-sponsored by the Architectural League of New York). It was based on her book of the same name (with the photographer Cervin Robinson), one of the first serious studies to validate American Art Deco commercial architecture. With Martin Filler, among others, she was a guest curator of the 1985 Whitney Museum of American Art exhibition "High Styles: Twentieth Century American Design." Bletter and Filler wrote and conducted the interviews for three documentary films produced by Michael Blackwood Productions: Beyond Utopia: Changing Attitudes in American Architecture (1983), Arata Isozaki: Early Work in Japan (1985), and Stirling (1987). She also served on the advisory panel and as an essayist for the Denver Art Museum’s 2001-2004 traveling exhibition "US Design: 1975-2000."

Publications
 Books

Articles

References

External links
 Faculty page at The Graduate Center, CUNY
 A symposium on modern & contemporary architecture in honor of Rosemarie Haag Bletter

1939 births
Living people
German emigrants to the United States
American women historians
American art historians
American architectural historians
American architecture writers
Columbia University alumni
Women art historians
New York University faculty
People from Heilbronn
21st-century American women
American women curators
American curators
German women curators